John L. Walters (born 16 April 1953) is an English editor, musician, critic and composer.

Early years
John L. Walters was born in Chesterfield, Derbyshire, England. He attended King's College London and holds a degree in Maths with Physics.

Career
In 1974 John L. Walters was a founding member of the band Landscape, which evolved into a five-piece band with Richard James Burgess (drums, electric drums, computer programming, synths, vocals), Christopher Heaton (synthesizers, piano, vocals), Andy Pask (fretted and fretless basses, vocals), Peter Thoms (trombone, electric trombone, vocals), and Walters (lyricon, soprano sax, flute, alto flute, computer programming, synths, vocals). The band is known for the 1981 hit single ‘Einstein A Go-Go’, written by Walters and Burgess, which reached number 5 in the UK charts, ’Norman Bates’ (Walters) and the album From the Tea-rooms of Mars .... 

After the band split, Walters went into record production. He subsequently produced and arranged records for Swans Way, Kissing the Pink, Twelfth Night, The Mike Gibbs Orchestra and pianist Mark Springer, and worked with other artists from the era including Kate Bush, for whom Walters and Burgess programmed Fairlight CMI on Never For Ever, Hot Gossip and Landscape colleague Richard James Burgess. 

From 1987 to 1997 Walters was a member of the "electronic jazz orchestra" Zyklus, with Neil Ardley, his former composition teacher, guitarist/programmer Warren Greveson and Ian Carr.

In 1992, with Laurence Aston, he co-founded the audio journal Unknown Public., which won a Prudential Award in 1996. Aston and Walters also founded the SoundCircus label with classical record producer James Mallinson and pianist Joanna MacGregor.

In 1997, after working for a number of newspapers and magazines, including the Architectural Review, he joined Eye magazine as managing editor. Walters has been the editor of Eye magazine since the publication of Eye no. 33 in 1999. He became its co-owner (with art director Simon Esterson) after a management buy-out in 2008. Walters also writes about creative music (including jazz, electronica, ‘world’ and contemporary music) for a number of newspapers and magazines including The Independent, in which he wrote a monthly music column called ‘Stretch Your Ears’ plus features, The Wire, Jazzwise, London Jazz News and The Guardian, for which he wrote the ‘On the Edge’ column for five years; also regular reviews and music features.

Walters has been a guest lecturer at colleges and conferences internationally, and he served as an external examiner at Central Saint Martins from 2003 to 2006. Walters has also served as chair for several international juries, including one for the inaugural European Design Award and also the 24th International Biennial of Graphic Design. He has received many nominations for the UK's BSME (British Society of Magazine Editors) Awards, and won in 2002, 2016 and 2018. In January 2010, Walters was the co-curator of a one-day conference about music and design at St Bride Library, London, and he co-programmes the regular ‘Type Tuesday’ events that Eye has held at St Bride since 2013. In February 2020 he spoke at the Plan D Conference in Zagreb.

Personal life
Walters is married to writer and journalist Clare Walters and has two daughters: circus artist and costume designer Jessie Rose, formerly a member of the hula hoop trio Hoop La La (semi-finalists, Britain’s Got Talent, 2008) and Rosie Walters.

Articles and books
Walters has written hundreds of articles about music and graphic design and two books.

• 50 Typefaces That Changed The World (Octopus, 2013)
• Alan Kitching, A Life In Letterpress (Laurence King, 2016)

References

Further reading
 Steven Heller, Merz to Emigre and Beyond: Avant-Garde Magazine Design of the Twentieth Century, Phaidon, 2003.
 The Barnbrook Bible, Rizzolli, 2007.
 Michael Bierut, Seventy-nine Short Essays on Design, Princeton Architectural Press, 2007.
 Rick Poynor (editor), Communicate: Independent British Graphic Design since the Sixties, Laurence King Publishing, 2004.
 Guinness Book of British Hit Singles, 7th Edition - 1988
 New Sounds New Styles, 1981. Layout by John Warwicker.
 John L. Walters discography at Discogs.com.
 Landscape discography.
 Jazz: the Rough Guide (2nd edition). The Rough Guides, 2000. 
 2004: The Rough Guide to Jazz, with Digby Fairweather & Brian Priestley (3rd edition), Rough Guides Limited. 
 Alyn Shipton, Out Of The Long Dark: The Life Of Ian Carr, Equinox Publishing, 2006. ISBN (Paperback) 1845532228 ISBN  (Paperback) 9781845532222
 Richard Cook and Brian Morton, The Penguin Guide to Jazz on CD, LP & Cassette, Penguin Books.
 BSME (British Society of Magazine Editors) award-winners, 2002 via Web archive.
 BSME (British Society of Magazine Editors) Awards shortlist 2010 via Press Gazette.
 BSME (British Society of Magazine Editors) Awards winners 2016 via InPublishing.
 BSME (British Society of Magazine Editors) Awards shortlist 2017.
 BSME (British Society of Magazine Editors) Awards winners 2018 via Magculture.
 BSME (British Society of Magazine Editors) Awards shortlist 2020.
 BSME (British Society of Magazine Editors) Awards shortlist 2021.
 Walters’ statement for BSME Editors’ Editor Award shortlist 2021.

External links
 list of articles by John L. Walters for Eye magazine
 list of articles by John L Walters for The Guardian
 list of articles by John L Walters for The Independent
 Eye in Focus: An Interview with John Walters by Steven Heller. Published in AIGA Voice: Journal of Design, 18 July 18 2006.
 The ninth of our interviews republished from Jeremy Leslie’s book 'Independence' features the co-owner and editor of design journal Eye, John L Walters. Published 18 August 2017.
 John L. Walters: The Editor Who Keeps An “Eye” On Graphic Design Worldwide. The Mr. Magazine™ Interview. Published 5 December 2018.
 David A. O’Brien’s Lyricon archives
 Zyklus on the Neil Ardley site

1953 births
Living people
People from Chesterfield, Derbyshire
English male journalists
English magazine editors
English record producers
English jazz composers
Male jazz composers
English male composers
English writers about music
Design writers
Alumni of King's College London
English male non-fiction writers
Landscape (band) members